1931–32 La Liga season started November 22, 1931, and finished April 3, 1932. As the Spanish Second Republic was established preceding the season, all the applicable clubs dropped the Royal patronage from their names and remove the crowns from their crests.

Athletic Bilbao was the defending champion. Madrid FC won its first title after finishing the season unbeaten. Valencia took part for the first time.

Team information

League table

Results

Top scorers

Pichichi Trophy
Note: This list is the alternative top scorers list provided by newspaper Diario Marca, it differs from the one above which is based on official match reports

References
La liga top scorers 1931/32

External links
LFP website

1931 1932
1931–32 in Spanish football leagues
Spain